Adam Blommé (born 19 April 1996) is a Swedish professional golfer. He won 2021 Swedish Golf Tour Order of Merit and joined the Challenge Tour, where he was runner-up at the 2023 Dimension Data Pro-Am.

Amateur career
Blommé won several titles on the junior circuit in Sweden. He lost a playoff to Marcus Kinhult at the 2014 Swedish Junior Strokeplay Championship, and was runner-up at the event again in 2015.

He appeared for the National Team at the European Amateur Team Championship three times, securing the bronze medal at the 2015 European Amateur Team Championship alongside Tobias Edén and Marcus Kinhult. In 2017, he won his semi-final match against Manuel Elvira of Spain, and his team finished fourth. 

He was part of the Swedish team that finished 4th in the 2014 Eisenhower Trophy in Kuruizawa, Japan, where he was beaten by Kinhult as the best Swedish player, who had the 6th best individual score, five strokes from winner Jon Rahm.

Blommé played collegiate golf at Odessa College 2015–2017, where he won individually four times and secured the win for the Odessa Wranglers in the NJCAA's National Championship, and helped the team become the number one ranked in the nation. After two years he transferred to Texas Tech University, where he played with the Texas Tech Red Raiders golf team 2017–2019. He helped recruit Ludvig Åberg to Texas Tech.

Representing Sweden at the 2019 The Spirit International Amateur Golf Championship alongside Vincent Norrman, Beatrice Wallin and Maja Stark, he helped secured the men's silver, only beaten by the U.S. team.

Professional career
Blommé turned professional in late 2019 and joined the Swedish Golf Tour. In 2021, he recorded nine top-10 finishes, including reaching the final of the Swedish Matchplay Championship, and topped the Order of Merit. He finished fourth in the Nordic Golf League rankings to earn promotion to the Challenge Tour. 

In 2023, Blommé led the Dimension Data Pro-Am in South Africa after two rounds, and finished the tournament as runner-up, four shots behind Oliver Bekker. With the result, he rose to No 1 status on the Challenge Tour's Road to Mallorca standings. He shot a 63 to take the lead after round one in the Nelson Mandela Bay Championship the following week, before a 9 on the penultimate hole saw him crash down the results list.

Amateur wins
2009 Skandia Tour Distriktsfinal SGDF
2012 Titleist Footjoy Junior Open, Alex Norén Junior Open
2013 Vassunda Junior Open
2016 NJCAA SW Championship, NJCAA District 2 Championship, High Country Shootout
2017 NJCAA District 2 Championship

Source:

Professional wins (3)

Swedish Future Series wins (3)

Team appearances
Amateur
European Boys' Team Championship  (representing Sweden): 2013, 2014
Eisenhower Trophy (representing Sweden): 2014
European Amateur Team Championship (representing Sweden): 2015, 2016, 2017
The Spirit International Amateur Golf Championship (representing Sweden): 2019

Sources:

References

External links

Swedish male golfers
Odessa Wranglers men's golfers
Texas Tech Red Raiders men's golfers
Golfers from Stockholm
1996 births
Living people